Fawn Pond is a  pond in Plymouth, Massachusetts. The pond is located south of Halfway Pond, northwest of Deer Pond, north of White Island Pond, northeast of Five Mile Pond, and east of Fearing Pond and Abner Pond, outside the eastern boundary of Myles Standish State Forest. The outflow is a stream that flows into the Agawam River.

External links
Environmental Protection Agency

Ponds of Plymouth, Massachusetts
Ponds of Massachusetts